Lawi afrika mwakalomba (born 21 June 1996) is a Tanzanian footballer who plays for Young Africans SC as a left winger.

Club career
Born in Morogoro, Mussa started his career with Azam FC in 2013. In April 2016, he went on a trial at CD Tenerife, and after impressing in friendly matches, he signed a two-year deal in May and was assigned to the reserves in Tercera División.

Mussa made his debut abroad on 14 January 2017, starting and scoring his team's second in a 2–2 away draw against CF Unión Viera. On 30 April, he scored a brace in a 5–1 win at UD Lanzarote.

On 12 August 2020, Mussa returned to his home country after signing for Young Africans.

International career
Mussa made his debut for the Tanzania national football team on 19 November 2013, coming on as a substitute in a 0–0 friendly draw against Zimbabwe.

References

External links

1996 births
Living people
People from Morogoro Region
Tanzanian footballers
Association football wingers
Azam F.C. players
Young Africans S.C. players
Tercera División players
CD Tenerife B players
2019 Africa Cup of Nations players
Tanzania international footballers
Tanzanian expatriate footballers
Expatriate footballers in Spain
Tanzanian Premier League players
Tanzania A' international footballers
2020 African Nations Championship players
Tanzanian expatriate sportspeople in Spain